The Decreet of Ranking of 5 March 1606 determined the relative precedence of members of the peerage of Scotland.

Background
The increasing number of disputes between peers as to the order in which they ranked and voted in Parliament and in councils caused King James VI and his Privy Council to appoint Lords Commissioners to determine each peer's rank and place. The peers or their representatives were invited to provide evidence to support their claims. The resultant "decreet" was registered in the books of the Privy Council and passed to the Lord Clerk Register and the Lord Lyon, to be used to determine precedence on all future occasions. Peers who felt themselves disadvantaged had the right to present new evidence before the Lords of Council and Session for a "reduction" to the Decreet of Ranking, but were otherwise bound by it.

List of the peers of Scotland on 5 March 1606, by rank
 Ludovic Stewart, 2nd Duke of Lennox
 James Hamilton, 2nd Marquis of Hamilton
 George Gordon, 1st Marquis of Huntly
 William Douglas, 10th Earl of Angus
 Archibald Campbell, 7th Earl of Argyll
 David Lindsay, 11th Earl of Crawford
 Francis Hay, 9th Earl of Erroll
 George Keith, 5th Earl Marischal
 Alexander Gordon, 12th Earl of Sutherland
 John Erskine, 19th Earl of Mar
 Andrew Leslie, 5th Earl of Rothes
 William Douglas, 6th Earl of Morton
 William Graham, 7th Earl of Menteith
 Hugh Montgomerie, 5th Earl of Eglinton
 John Graham, 3rd Earl of Montrose
 John Kennedy, 5th Earl of Cassilis
 George Sinclair, 5th Earl of Caithness
 James Cunningham, 7th Earl of Glencairn
 Mary Douglas, 6th Countess of Buchan
 James Stewart, 3rd Earl of Moray
 Patrick Stewart, 2nd Earl of Orkney
 James Stewart, 2nd Earl of Atholl
 Alexander Livingston, 1st Earl of Linlithgow
 Alexander Home, 1st Earl of Home
 James Drummond, 1st Earl of Perth
 Alexander Seton, 1st Earl of Dunfermline
 George Home, 1st Earl of Dunbar
 John Lindsay, 8th Lord Lindsay
 John Forbes, 8th Lord Forbes
 Patrick Lyon, 9th Lord Glamis
 John Fleming, 6th Lord Fleming
 John Abernethy, 8th Lord Saltoun
 Patrick Gray, 5th Lord Gray
 Andrew Stuart, 3rd Lord Stuart of Ochiltree
 Alan Cathcart, 4th Lord Cathcart
 James Douglas, 6th Lord Carlyle
 Robert Crichton, 8th Lord Crichton of Sanquhar
 James Hay, 7th Lord Hay of Yester
 Robert Sempill, 4th Lord Sempill
 James Sinclair, 7th Lord Sinclair
 John Maxwell, 6th Lord Herries of Terregles
 Alexander Elphinstone, 4th Lord Elphinstone
 John Maxwell, 9th Lord Maxwell
 Laurence Oliphant, 5th Lord Oliphant
 Simon Fraser, 6th Lord Lovat
 James Ogilvy, 5th Lord Ogilvy
 John Borthwick, 8th Lord Borthwick
 James Ross, 6th Lord Ross
 Thomas Boyd, 6th Lord Boyd
 James Sandilands, 2nd Lord Torphichen
 Claud Hamilton, 1st Lord Paisley
 Mark Kerr, 1st Lord Newbattle
 John Maitland, 2nd Lord Thirlestane
 Alexander Lindsay, 1st Lord Spynie
 Robert Ker, 1st Lord Roxburghe
 Patrick Leslie, 1st Lord Lindores
 Hugh Campbell, 1st Lord Campbell of Loudoun
 Thomas Erskine, 1st Lord Erskine of Dirletoun
 Edward Bruce, 1st Lord Bruce of Kinloss
 James Hamilton, 1st Lord Abercorn
 James Elphinstone, 1st Lord Balmerino
 John Murray, 1st Lord Murray of Tullibardine
 James Colville, 1st Lord Colville of Culross
 David Murray, 1st Lord Scone

Robert Seton, 2nd Earl of Winton appears to have been omitted.

Subsequent reductions to the decreet of 1606
 In 1606 the Countess of Buchan (then a minor) had been ranked according to a regrant of the Earldom in 1547. In 1628, on an action of the Countess, the Earldom of Buchan was placed according to its original creation in 1469, ahead of the Earls of Eglinton, Montrose, Cassillis, Caithness and Glencairn.
 In 1606 the Earl of Glencairn did not appear, and his precedency was assigned on the earliest evidence then available, from 1503. In 1609 the original charter of 1488 was discovered and in 1610 the Earl brought a successful action which resulted in his being placed above the Earls of Eglinton, Montrose, Cassillis and Caithness. In 1617 the Earl of Eglinton had this judgement overturned on a technicality, but Glencairn's successor brought another action in 1637 and his Earldom's precedence according to the decreet of 1610 was reinstated in 1648.

References
 Sir George Mackenzie of Rosehaugh, "Observations upon the Laws and Customs of Nations as to Precedency", pp. 27-9, included in the sixth edition of John Guillim's A Display of Heraldry (London, 1724).

1606 in Scotland
Scotland 2
Peerage of Scotland
Ranking of 1606